Medchal Assembly constituency is a constituency of Telangana Legislative Assembly, India. It is one of 7 constituencies in Medchal district. It is part of Malkajgiri Lok Sabha constituency.

Ch. Malla Reddy of Telangana Rashtra Samithi is currently representing the constituency.

Mandals
The Assembly Constituency presently comprises the following Mandals:

Members of Legislative Assembly

Election results

Andhra Pradesh Legislative Assembly election, 2009

Telangana Legislative Assembly election, 2014

Telangana Legislative Assembly election, 2018

See also
 Medchal
 List of constituencies of Telangana Legislative Assembly

References

Assembly constituencies of Telangana
Ranga Reddy district